Madhupur Satra is a religious institutional center associated with the Ekasarana tradition of Vaishnavism, situated in Cooch Behar, the Indian state of West Bengal.It is established by Assamese Vaishnavite monasteries for religious practices in 16th century during Koch kingdom.The great Bhakti Saint Mahapurusha Srimanta Sankardeva (1449-1568 AD) and his disciple Mahapurusha Madhavadeva died here.

Geography

Location

Note: The map alongside presents some of the notable locations in the subdivision. All places marked in the map are linked in the larger full screen map.

Establishment
This satra buildings were built by Raja Nara Narayan of the Koch dynasty in the 16th century. After independence of India, Mahendra Mohan Choudhury, chief minister of Assam rebuilt  the houses, Namghar, roads with brick and mortar and built Sankardev's temple in January, 1968 with help of 'Madhupur Satra Samiti'.

Satradhikar
Monks, called "bhakats", live in satras under a "satradhikar" or "Mahanta". The main disciple of Srimanta Sankardeva was Madhavadeva.Before death of Sankardeva, he gave the responsibility to his disciple Madhavadeva (-1596 AD), to take care of  the Satras. He laid down the system of daily prayer service and initiated the system of religious tithes.Later, Achyut guru, Shree Ram Ata, bishnu Ata became satradhikar of Madupur satra. After death of Bishnu Ata, 'Samuha' (bhaktas of some nearest villages) took responsibility of this satra. Later, Burhir-po Gobinda Atoi, Gopinath Atoi, Krishna Bapu Satriya, Ramnath Bapu Satriya, Gangaram Bapu Satriya, Pocharam vorali Atoi, Niron Atoi, Tolon Atoi, Lakshmikanta Atoi burha-bhakta, Fatik Chandra Dev Goswami took responsibility as Satradhikar. After the death of Fatik Chandra Dev Goswami, Lakshmikanta Mahanta became Satradhikar of Madhupur satra on 18 April 2012.

Structures
The Satra is four-sided enclosed area with four gateways ("karapat"). Centrally placed in this enclosure is a rectangular prayer-hall ("Namghar" or "kirtanghar") at the aligned in the east–west direction. On its eastern side there is an additional independent structure called the "Manikut" (jewel-house), the sanctum santorum, in which the "asana", a wooden tetradehral structure with four carved lions), is placed containing the main object of worship (usually a copy of the Bhagavat Purana in manuscript or an idol). The "namghar" is surrounded by four straight rows of huts, called "hati", in which monks (bhakats) reside. The adhikara and other high officers of the Satra reside in the eastern "hatis".

Cultural programmes
Some of the cultural programmes, which are held in Sattras:-
 Bhaona
 Doul utsav or Deul
 Janmastami
 Rasa lila or Raas utsav
 Sankardeva's birth anniversary celebration in October.
 First Satradhikar Gobinda Ata's death anniversary celebration in Magh (January–February) month.

See also
 List of Satras
 Sattriya
 Barpeta Satra
 Dakshinpat Satra

Further reading
 Shree Shree Sankardeva O Shree Shree Madhavadeva – Writer: Lakshminath Bezbaroa
 Srimanta Sankardeva O teor jugor Boishnobacharyasakal – Dr. Shibnath Berman
 Mahapurush Srimanta Sankardebor Chomu Parichoy O Boikuntha Proyanor Sthan Shree Shree Madhupur (dham) Satrar Itibitto – Pitambar Ray Bhakta (Cooch Behar).

Madhupur Satra picture gallery

References

External links

16th-century Hindu temples
Satras (Ekasarana Dharma)
Hindu temples in West Bengal
Hindu temples in Cooch Behar district
Buildings and structures in Cooch Behar district
Cultural history of Assam
Hindu pilgrimage sites in India
Tourist attractions in Cooch Behar district